J. Percy Given was a college football player and coach.

Georgetown

Player

He was an All-Southern center for the Georgetown Hoyas of Georgetown University,  weighing 225 pounds. Georgetown authorities claimed it was Given, as opposed to Germany Schulz, who was the first "roving center" or linebacker in the game against Navy in 1902. Given was selected as the second team center for the Georgetown all-time football team. One writer called him "the greatest center that Georgetown has ever had."

Coach

Given assisted coaching the team in 1906 and 1908. He was inducted to the Georgetown Athletic Hall of Fame in 1953.

References

American football centers
Georgetown Hoyas football players
All-Southern college football players
American football linebackers
Georgetown Hoyas football coaches